Elko New Market is a city in Scott County, Minnesota, United States.  It was founded in 2006 through a merger of bordering cities Elko and New Market. The population was 4,846 at the 2020 census.

Served by Interstate 35 and Scott County Road 2, the city contains one public school, and is notable as the location of Elko Speedway. The New Market Hotel and Store is listed on the National Register of Historic Places. The city contains a marker for the Big Woods of south–central Minnesota.

History
Elko was initially a railway village in 1858. New Market was named for the town near Cambridge, England though it was first named Jackson until its establishment about the same time. Both Elko and New Market were common town names of the era according to the Minnesota Historical Society.

On March 21, 2006, both the cities of Elko and New Market passed a referendum to merge. The new city was named Elko New Market with the merger taking effect on January 1, 2007.

Geography
Located midway between the cities of Minneapolis and Faribault along Interstate 35, Elko New Market is in the southern exurban belt of the Minneapolis – Saint Paul area.

Climate
The climate of Elko New Market is classified as warm-summer humid continental with features of a hot-summer humid continental (Köppen Dfa).

Demographics

2010 census
As of the census of 2010, there were 4,110 people, 1,259 households, and 1,064 families residing in the city. The racial makeup of the city was 92.5% White, 1.6% African American, 0.3% Native American, 3.1% Asian, 0.2% from other races, and 2.2% from two or more races. Hispanic or Latino of any race were 2.3% of the population.

There were 1,259 households, of which 60.4% had children under the age of 18 living with them, 73.9% were married couples living together, 6.3% had a female householder with no husband present, 4.3% had a male householder with no wife present, and 15.5% were non-families. 9.5% of all households were made up of individuals, and 0.9% had someone living alone who was 65 years of age or older. The average household size was 3.26 and the average family size was 3.53.

The median age in the city was 30.4 years. 38% of residents were under the age of 18; 4.6% were between the ages of 18 and 24; 39.5% were from 25 to 44; 15.1% were from 45 to 64; and 2.7% were 65 years of age or older. The gender makeup of the city was 50.9% male and 49.1% female.

Sports
Elko Speedway is located in Elko New Market.

Education
 Eagle View Elementary

References

External links

Cities in Scott County, Minnesota
Cities in Minnesota
2006 establishments in Minnesota